Andrew Parr is an American para-alpine skier. He represented the United States at the 2002 Winter Paralympics and at the 2006 Winter Paralympics in alpine skiing.

In 2002, he won the silver medal in the Men's Slalom B3 event and the bronze medal in the Men's Giant Slalom B3 event.

References 

Living people
Year of birth missing (living people)
Place of birth missing (living people)
Paralympic alpine skiers of the United States
American male alpine skiers
Alpine skiers at the 2002 Winter Paralympics
Alpine skiers at the 2006 Winter Paralympics
Medalists at the 2002 Winter Paralympics
Paralympic silver medalists for the United States
Paralympic medalists in alpine skiing